Alexander Johann Heinrich Friedrich Möller (26 April 1903 – 2 October 1985) was a German politician of the Social Democratic Party (SPD).

Möller was born in Dortmund. He was a member of the Landtag of Baden-Württemberg from 1946 to 5 October 1961, when he was elected to the Bundestag. His successor was Walther Wäldele. Möller stayed in the Bundestag up to 1976.

From 1969 to 1971, Möller served as Federal Minister of Finance in the Cabinet of Willy Brandt.

Besides being active in the SPD, Möller was director general of and Chief Executive Officer of the Karlsruher Lebensversicherung AG. Hence, his nickname was Genosse Generaldirektor (roughly: Comrade director general), which he also used as a title of his memoirs (1978).

Möller is an honorary citizen of Karlsruhe, where he died.

1903 births
1985 deaths
Members of the Bundestag for Baden-Württemberg
Politicians from Dortmund
People from the Province of Westphalia
Finance ministers of Germany
Grand Crosses 1st class of the Order of Merit of the Federal Republic of Germany
Recipients of the Order of Merit of Baden-Württemberg
Members of the Landtag of Baden-Württemberg
Members of the Bundestag for the Social Democratic Party of Germany